Bago Region Hluttaw is the legislature of the Burmese region of Bago Region. It is a unicameral body, consisting of 76 members, including 57 elected members and 19 military representatives. As of February 2016, the Hluttaw was led by speaker Khin Maung Yin of the National League for Democracy (NLD).

As of the 2015 general election, the National League for Democracy (NLD) won the most contested seats in the legislature, based on the most recent election results.

General Election results (Nov. 2015)

See also
State and Region Hluttaws
Pyidaungsu Hluttaw

References

Unicameral legislatures
Bago Region
Legislatures of Burmese states and regions